Stevenston Moorpark railway station was a railway station serving the town of Stevenston, North Ayrshire, Scotland as part of the Lanarkshire and Ayrshire Railway (L&AR).

History
The station opened on 3 September 1888 and was simply known as Stevenston. It closed between 1 January 1917 and 1 February 1919 due to wartime economy, and upon the grouping of the L&AR into the London, Midland and Scottish Railway in 1923, the station was renamed Stevenston Moorpark on 2 June 1924. The station closed to passengers on 4 July 1932, however it was reopened for a time within two years when a special return fare price was introduced. The line saw use for trains going to Ardrossan Montgomerie Pier and the Ardrossan Shell Mex plant until 1968.

Today the site of Stevenston Moorpark is occupied by Caley Court, a residential home named after L&AR owners Caledonian Railway.

References

Notes

Sources 
 
 

Disused railway stations in North Ayrshire
Railway stations in Great Britain opened in 1888
Railway stations in Great Britain closed in 1917
Railway stations in Great Britain opened in 1919
Railway stations in Great Britain closed in 1932
Former Caledonian Railway stations
Ardrossan−Saltcoats−Stevenston